The women's team in table tennis at the 2015 European Games in Baku was the 1st edition of the event in a European Games It was held at the Baku Crystal Hall from 13 to 15 June 2015.

Qualification

Result

First round

Quarterfinals

Semifinals

Bronze Medal

Gold Medal

External links
 
 

Women's team
European Games